The 1999 Five Nations Championship (sponsored by Lloyds TSB) was the seventieth series of the rugby union Five Nations Championship. Including the previous incarnations as the Home Nations and Five Nations, this was the hundred-and-fifth series of the northern hemisphere rugby union championship. Ten matches were played over five weekends from 6 February to 11 April. Scotland scored sixteen tries in the tournament, to England's eight.

It was notable for the dramatic climax to the tournament, which was decided in the dying minutes of the final match. England were heavy favourites to beat Wales and claim both the tournament title and Grand Slam. With England leading the match by six points as the game entered injury time, Wales centre Scott Gibbs evaded a number of tackles to score a try from approximately 20 metres. Neil Jenkins successfully converted to claim victory for Wales by a single point and hand the Championship to Scotland in one of the most memorable matches in the tournament's history. Scotland had staged their own remarkable upset the previous day, scoring five first-half tries to beat France in Paris for only the second time in thirty years.

Scotland's Gregor Townsend became only the fifth player in history to score a try against each other country in the five nations tournament. He also became the second Scotsman to do so, following on from Johnnie Wallace in 1925. The other men to achieve the feat were Carston Catcheside (England 1924), Patrick Estève (France 1983) and Phillipe Sella (France 1986). After him, French Philippe Bernat-Salles scored a try in the 5 games of the new '6 Nations' in 2001.

This was the last Five Nations Championship; in 2000,  joined the tournament, which became the Six Nations Championship. Indeed, Italy played all the Five Nations sides during the 1998/99 season, partly in preparation for joining the tournament the following year, albeit that the game against England (at Huddersfield) was a World Cup qualifier. Italy lost all five of these games.

Participants
The teams involved were:

Squads

Table

Results

Week 1

Week 2

Week 3

Week 4

Week 5

References

External links

The official RBS Six Nations Site
1999 championship results on ESPN Scrum

1999 rugby union tournaments for national teams
1999
 
1998–99 in Irish rugby union
1998–99 in English rugby union
1998–99 in Welsh rugby union
1998–99 in Scottish rugby union
1998–99 in French rugby union
Five Nations
Five Nations
Five Nations